Orthostatic intolerance (OI) is the development of symptoms when standing upright that are relieved when reclining. There are many types of orthostatic intolerance.  OI can be a subcategory of dysautonomia, a disorder of the autonomic nervous system occurring when an individual stands up. Some animal species with orthostatic hypotension have evolved to cope with orthostatic disturbances.

A substantial overlap is seen between syndromes of orthostatic intolerance on the one hand, and either chronic fatigue syndrome  or fibromyalgia  on the other.  It affects more women than men (female-to-male ratio is at least 4:1), usually under the age of 35.

Orthostatic intolerance occurs in humans because standing upright is a fundamental stressor, so requires rapid and effective circulatory and neurologic compensations to maintain blood pressure, cerebral blood flow, and consciousness.  When a human stands, about 750 ml of thoracic blood are abruptly translocated downward.  People who have OI lack the basic mechanisms to compensate for this deficit.  Changes in heart rate, blood pressure, and cerebral blood flow that produce OI may be caused by abnormalities in the interactions between blood volume control, the cardiovascular system, the nervous system, and circulation control system.

Signs and symptoms
Orthostatic intolerance is divided, roughly based on patient history, in two variants: acute and chronic.

Acute OI

Patients who have acute OI usually manifest the disorder by a temporary loss of consciousness and posture, with rapid recovery (simple faints, or syncope), as well as remaining conscious during their loss of posture.  This is different from a syncope caused by cardiac problems because the triggers for the fainting spell (standing, heat, emotion) and identifiable prodromal symptoms (nausea, blurred vision, headache) are known.  As  Dr. Julian M. Stewart, an expert in OI from New York Medical College states, "Many syncopal patients have no intercurrent illness; between faints, they are well."

Symptoms:
 Altered vision (blurred vision, "white outs"/gray outs, black outs, double vision)
 Anxiety
 Exercise intolerance
 Fatigue
 Headache
 Heart palpitations, as the heart races to compensate for the falling blood pressure
 Hyperpnea or sensation of difficulty breathing or swallowing (see also hyperventilation syndrome)
 Lightheadedness
 Sweating
 Tremulousness
 Weakness

A classic manifestation of acute OI is a soldier who faints after standing rigidly at attention for an extended period of time.

Chronic OI

Patients with chronic orthostatic intolerance have symptoms on most or all days.  Their symptoms may include most of the symptoms of acute OI, plus:
 Nausea
 Neurocognitive deficits, such as attention problems
 Pallor
 Sensitivity to heat
 Sleep problems
 Other vasomotor symptoms.

Causes
Symptoms of OI are triggered by:
 An upright posture for long periods (e.g. standing in line, standing in a shower, or even sitting at a desk)
 A warm environment (e.g. hot summer weather, a hot crowded room, a hot shower or bath, after exercise)
 Emotionally stressful events (seeing blood or gory scenes, being scared or anxious)
 Return from an extended stay in space, when the body is not yet readapted to gravity
 Extended bedrest
 Inadequate fluid and salt intake.

Diagnosis 
Many patients go undiagnosed or misdiagnosed and either untreated or treated for other disorders. Current tests for OI (tilt table test, autonomic assessment, and vascular integrity) can also specify and simplify treatment. Patients with dysautonomia symptoms can be referred to a cardiologist, neurologist, or even a gastroenterologist for treatment and management.

Management
Most patients experience an improvement of their symptoms, but for some, OI can be gravely disabling and can be progressive in nature, particularly if it is caused by an underlying condition that is deteriorating.  The ways in which symptoms present themselves vary greatly from patient to patient; as a result, individualized treatment plans are necessary.

OI is treated pharmacologically and nonpharmacologically.  Treatment does not cure OI; rather, it controls symptoms.

Physicians who specialize in treating OI agree that the single most important treatment is drinking more than 2 liters (8 cups) of fluids each day.  A steady, large supply of water or other fluids reduces most, and for some patients all, of the major symptoms of this condition.  Typically, patients fare best when they drink a glass of water no less frequently than every two hours during the day, instead of drinking a large quantity of water at a single point in the day.

For most severe cases and some milder cases, a combination of medications is used.  Individual responses to different medications vary widely, and a drug that dramatically improves one patient's symptoms may make another patient's symptoms much worse.  Medications focus on three main issues:

Medications that increase blood volume:
 Fludrocortisone (Florinef)
 Erythropoietin
 Hormonal contraception

Medications that inhibit acetylcholinesterase:
 Pyridostigmine

Medications that improve vasoconstriction:
 Stimulants: (e.g., Ritalin or Dexedrine)
 Midodrine (ProAmatine)
 Ephedrine and pseudoephedrine (Sudafed)
 Theophylline (low-dose)
 Selective serotonin reuptake inhibitors (SSRIs - Prozac, Zoloft, and Paxil)

Behavioral changes that patients with OI can make are:
 Avoiding triggers such as prolonged sitting, quiet standing, warm environments, or vasodilating medications
 Using postural maneuvers and pressure garments
 Treating co-existing medical conditions
 Increasing fluid and salt intake
 Physical therapy and exercise

Notable case
A notable person with OI is Greg Page, founding member and original lead singer of the Australian children's music group The Wiggles. Due to being diagnosed with this illness, Page left the group in late 2006, and was replaced by his understudy, Sam Moran. Two years later in late 2008, he went on to create his own fund for OI to help fund research into this then-little known disorder. Page recovered enough to temporarily return to The Wiggles in early 2012 to help with the transition to the next generation of Wiggles, after which he again left the group end of the year and was replaced by Emma Watkins and again by Tsehay Hawkins.

See also
 Orthostatic hypertension
 Orthostatic hypotension
 Postural orthostatic tachycardia syndrome (POTS)
 Vasovagal response

References

External links 

Vascular diseases
Peripheral nervous system disorders
Sensitivities